Senchal Wildlife Sanctuary was set up in 1915 in the Darjeeling District of West Bengal, India.

Geography

Location

It provides habitat for barking deer, wild boar, Himalayan black bear, Indian leopard, jungle cat, rhesus monkey, Assam macaque, and Himalayan flying squirrel. The sanctuary is also rich in bird life. The two Senchal lakes supply drinking water to the town of Darjeeling.

The sanctuary consists of compactly blended natural and man-made forests. Oak is the most represented, followed by Kapasi, Katus, Kawla, Champ, etc.

The temperature range is from 1.7 during the cold season to 18.9 degrees Celsius during the hot season.

Note: The map alongside presents some of the notable locations in the subdivision. All places marked in the map are linked in the larger full screen map.

References

External links
 Senchal Game Sanctuary at wildbengal.com (West Bengal Wildlife Sanctuaries)

Wildlife sanctuaries in West Bengal
Tourist attractions in Darjeeling district
Protected areas established in 1915
1915 establishments in British India